Aeterni Patris may refer to:
Aeterni Patris Filius, a 1621 papal bull regulating papal conclaves
Aeterni Patris, an 1868 papal bull summoning the First Vatican Council
Aeterni Patris, an 1879 encyclical letter of Pope Leo XIII